Thomas E. "Tom" Saunders (born June 28, 1951) is an American politician. He is a member of the Indiana House of Representatives from the 54th District, serving since 1996. He is a member of the Republican party. He served as Chair of the Henry County Republican Party for 6 years and as its Vice Chair for 5 years. He also served as Henry County Assessor for 16 years. Saunders retired in 2022 after serving the district for twenty-five years.

References

Living people
Republican Party members of the Indiana House of Representatives
People from Henry County, Indiana
21st-century American politicians
1951 births